Petrelik Island is a rocky island in the southwest part of Hamburg Bay on the northwest coast of Anvers Island in the Palmer Archipelago, Antarctica.  The feature is 380 m long in southwest-northeast direction and 200 m wide, and is separated from Emen Island to the southeast by a 160 m wide passage.

The island is named after the settlement of Petrelik in Southwestern Bulgaria.

Location

British mapping in 1974.

Maps
 Anvers Island and Brabant Island. Scale 1:250000 topographic map. BAS 250 Series, Sheet SQ 19-20/3&4. London, 1974.
 Antarctic Digital Database (ADD). Scale 1:250000 topographic map of Antarctica. Scientific Committee on Antarctic Research (SCAR). Since 1993, regularly upgraded and updated.

References
 Bulgarian Antarctic Gazetteer. Antarctic Place-names Commission. (details in Bulgarian, basic data in English)
 Petrelik Island. SCAR Composite Antarctic Gazetteer.

External links
 Petrelik Island. Copernix satellite image

Islands of the Palmer Archipelago
Bulgaria and the Antarctic